A graphic organizer, also known as a knowledge map, concept map, story map, cognitive organizer, advance organizer, or concept diagram is a pedagogical tool that uses visual symbols to express knowledge and concepts through relationships between them.
The main purpose of a graphic organizer is to provide a visual aid to facilitate learning and instruction.

Types of organizers
Graphic organizers take many forms:

Relational organizers
 Storyboard
 Fishbone - Ishikawa diagram
 Cause and effect web
 Chart
 T-Chart
 Category/classification organizers
 Concept mapping
 KWL tables
 Mind mapping
Sequence organizers
Chain
 Ladder - Story map
 Stairs - Topic map
Compare contrast organizers''
 Dashboard
 Venn diagrams
 Double bubble map
Concept development organizers
 Story web
Word web
 Circle chart
 Flow chart
 Cluster diagram
 Lotus diagram
 Star diagram
Options and control device organizers
 Mechanical control panel
 Graphical user interface

Enhancing students' skills
A review study concluded that using graphic organizers improves student performance in the following areas:

 Retention
 Students remember information better and can better recall it when it is represented and learned both visually and verbally.

 Reading comprehension
 The use of graphic organizers helps improving the reading comprehension of students.

 Student achievement
 Students with and without learning disabilities improve achievement across content areas and grade levels.

 Thinking and learning skills; critical thinking
 When students develop and use a graphic organizer their  higher order thinking  and critical thinking skills are enhanced.

See also
 Diagram
 Four square writing method
 KWL table
 Thinking Maps
 Visualization (graphic)

References 

Infographics
Educational psychology